The Bay of Bakar is located on the Croatian Adriatic coast, within the Gulf of Kvarner. There are two towns centered on bay of Bakar: Bakar and Kraljevica. While Bakar and Kraljevica are port towns, in outback of bay of Bakar there are the industry zones and free zones of Kukuljanovo. The bay itself contains Bulk Cargo Terminal of the Port of Rijeka, handling coal, iron ore and bulk cargo. Its annual capacity is 4 million tonnes and it accommodates Capesize ships. The port facilities are planned to be expanded through construction of a car terminal in the bay.

Geography
 Length: 4.5 km.
 Width:1 km
 NE part: plentiful fresh water

References

Bays of Croatia
Bays of the Adriatic Sea